Toab is a parish on the Orkney Mainland, situated in the East Mainland

Toab is located off the A960 road at the head of Deer Sound on the Mainland, Orkney Islands, Scotland. It is in the parish of St Andrews – along with Tankerness – it is thought its name derives from the Norse phrase for the place where visiting ships had to pay a toll.

People from Toab are known as ‘Toaboggans’, although this term is almost never used.

See also 
Mine Howe

References

External links 

Villages on Mainland, Orkney